Endopachys is a genus of corals belonging to the family Dendrophylliidae.

The species of this genus are found in Pacific, Atlantic and Indian Ocean.

Species:

Endopachys alatum 
Endopachys alticostatum 
Endopachys bulbosa 
Endopachys expansum 
Endopachys grayi 
Endopachys lonsdalei 
Endopachys maclurii 
Endopachys minutum 
Endopachys shaleri 
Endopachys tampae 
Endopachys triangulare

References

Dendrophylliidae
Scleractinia genera